Libya–Mexico relations are the diplomatic relations between Libya and Mexico. Both nations are members of the United Nations.

History
In 1947, Libya obtained its independence from Italy. In 1961, Mexican President Adolfo López Mateos sent a presidential delegation of goodwill, led by Special Envoy Alejandro Carrillo Marcor and Delegate José Ezequiel Iturriaga, to visit Libya to pave the way for establishing diplomatic relations between the two nations. On 6 August 1975, Libya and Mexico established diplomatic relations. Initial relations between both nations were limited and took place in mainly multilateral organizations such as at the United Nations. In December 2003, Colonel Muammar Gaddafi announced that Libya would end its programs to develop weapons of mass destruction and to renounce terrorism. Colonel Gaddafi also made significant strides in normalizing relations with western nations. In January 2008, Libya opened a resident embassy in Mexico City.

In April 2008, Libyan Foreign Minister Abdel Rahman Shalgham paid an official visit to Mexico and met with Mexican Foreign Minister Patricia Espinosa Cantellano. Foreign Minister Shalgham visit was the first high-level visit to Mexico by a Libyan representative. During the visit, both Foreign Ministers discussed evaluating the state of the bilateral relationship between both nations and highlighted the perspectives for its strengthening through political dialogue and economic, commercial, cultural and educational cooperation. Furthermore, they jointly stressed the importance of promoting bilateral cooperation in specific areas such as water resources, the preservation of archaeological sites and desertification, as well as in the exchange of experiences in migratory and consular matters. As a result of the visit, both nations signed a Memorandum of Understanding for the Establishment of a Consultation Mechanism on Mutual Issues between both nations.

In June 2009, Mexican ambassador resident in Addis Ababa, Ethiopia participated in the 13th African Union summit held in Sirte, Libya. In August 2009, Mexican Director General for Africa and Middle East, Sara Valdés, paid a visit to Tripoli to celebrate the first consultation of mutual issues between both nations. In February 2011, Libya experienced its first civil war. During the war, Mexico evacuated its citizens from the country. In July 2011, Mexican authorities foiled a plan to smuggle former Colonel Gaddafi's son, Al-Saadi Gaddafi, and other Gaddafi family members into Mexico.

The Mexican government offers scholarships for students from Libya each year who wish to pursue a master's or doctorate degree at a Mexican university. In December 2016, the Mexican Chamber of Deputies established a Mexico-Libya Friendship Group.

High-level visits
High-level visit from Libya to Mexico
 Foreign Minister Abdel Rahman Shalgham (2008)

High-level visit from Mexico to Libya
 Special Envoy Alejandro Carrillo Marcor (1961)
 Delegate José Ezequiel Iturriaga (1961)
 Director General for Africa and Middle East Sara Valdés (2009)

Trade

In 2018, trade between Libya and Mexico totaled US$9.2 million. Libya's main exports to Mexico include: thermocouple cables (or their extension cords) and cash registers. Mexico's main exports to Libya include: blankets made of synthetic fibers (except for electrical ones); preparations for dental fillings based on acrylic resins; surgical suture material (consisting of a needle with thread); and gaskets. Between 1999 and 2017, Libyan investments in Mexico totaled US$2 million. The investments from Libya to Mexico were in manufacturing, commerce, transportation, post office, storage, real estate services and real estate rentals in the states of Baja California, Mexico City, Quintana Roo and Yucatán.

Diplomatic missions
 Libya has an embassy in Mexico City.
 Mexico is accredited to Libya from its embassy in Algiers, Algeria.

References 

Mexico
Libya